Timpson may refer to:

 Timpson (surname)
 Timpson, Texas, US
 Timpson (retailer), a British multinational retailer

See also
 Timson (disambiguation)